Stephanodus is a genus of fossil fish that lived in the Mesozoic era. It was described by Zittel in 1883.

References

Pycnodontiformes genera